Marousi or Maroussi (also Αμαρούσιο Amarousio) is a suburb in the northeastern part of the Athens agglomeration, Greece. Marousi dates back to the era of the ancient Athenian Republic; its ancient name was Athmonon (Ἄθμονον) and it represented one of the 10 Athenian sub-cities. The area held a main ancient temple, where Amarysia Artemis, the goddess of hunting, was adored, and the city's modern name derives from that of the goddess, Amarysia, which denotes the origin of the worship back in Amarynthos, Euboea.

Geography

The municipality has an area of 12.938 km2. The built-up area of Marousi is continuous with those of the neighbouring suburbs Pefki, Kifisia, Vrilissia and Halandri. Within Marousi lies the biggest forest in urban Athens, "Dasos Syngrou" (also "Alsos Syggrou"). The Athens Olympic Sports Complex, the largest sports complex in Greece, built for the 2004 Summer Olympics, is located in the southwestern part of the municipality.

The main thoroughfare is Kifisias Avenue, which connects Marousi with central Athens and the northern beltway Motorway 6. Marousi has 3 stations on Athens Metro Line 1, Neratziotissa,  and  stations and two suburban (Proastiakos) commuter railway stations: Nerantziotissa station and Kifisias railway station.

Marousi is also home to a number of prestigious public (Peiramatiko Lyceum Anavryton) and private educational institutions.

Economy

Marousi's favourable infrastructure (Motorway 6, Athens Metro, and the Athens Suburban Railway) has led to strong economic growth. The main offices of the Greek subsidiaries of several multinational corporations, including Kodak, Bayer, Kimberly-Clark, Siemens, Takeda Pharmaceutical Company, Microsoft and Nestlé, and the ANT1 television studios are located in Marousi. The managing office of Consolidated Contractors Company, a large Middle Eastern and International EPC Contractor, is located in Marousi. The Mall Athens, one of the largest shopping centres in southeastern Europe, is situated in the southwestern part of Marousi.

Vivartia has its head office in Marousi.

Google Athens is headquartered in Marousi.

Education
The new building of Greek Ministry of Education is located in Marousi, in the district Neratziotissa. In the same district is located the School of Pedagogical and Technological Education, a Greek university. The German School of Athens is also located in Marousi.

Sports
Maroussi is the place of Greek Olympic Sport Center. It is located in the southwest of the suburb, in an area that is named Kalogreza. Maroussi has also some sport gymnasium such as Dais Indoor Hall and Maroussi Indoor Hall that are used by local teams. Local teams are Maroussi B.C. with long-time presence in A1 Ethniki Basketball and A.C. Doukas with many titles in Handball and Futsal. The Olympic Stadium was used as home stadium by famous clubs of Greek football, including by AEK as well as both Panathinaikos and Olympiacos.

Historical population

The village was historically Arvanitika speaking, however due to its proximity to Athens, it has undergone a language shift.

Twin cities
Marousi is twinned with the following cities:
 Faenza, Italy
 Niš, Serbia
 Lakatamia, Cyprus
 Mendavia,  Spain

Notable people 

Prince Michael of Greece (1938–), also known as Michel de Grece, son of Prince Christopher of Greece and grandson of King George I of the Hellenes. Prince Michael lived in Marousi from his marriage to Marina Karella in 1965, since late 1970s.
Vicky Kaya (1978–), fashion model and actress
Christos Kollias (born 1986), Greek basketball player.
Labis Livieratos, singer
Spiridon Louis (1873–1940), a Greek water-carrier who won the first modern-day Marathon at the 1896 Summer Olympics, thereby becoming a national hero
Aimilia Tsoulfa, Golden Medalist in Sailing, Athens Olympic Games 2004
Lydia Venieri, Artist
Aliki Vougiouklaki (1934–1996), movie star and singer who appeared in 42 movies, mostly musicals

Gallery

See also
List of settlements in Attica

References

External links

 Municipality of Amarousion
 Peiramatiko Lyceum of Anavryta 

 
Municipalities of Attica
Populated places in North Athens (regional unit)
Central business districts
Financial districts
Arvanite settlements